Maging Akin Ka Lamang (International title: Till You are Mine / ) is a 2008 Philippine television drama romance series broadcast by GMA Network. Based on a 1987 Philippine film of the same title, the series is the sixth instalment of Sine Novela. Directed by Gil Tejada Jr., it stars Nadine Samonte and Polo Ravales. It premiered on January 21, 2008 on the network's Dramarama sa Hapon line up. The series concluded on May 9, 2008 with a total of 78 episodes. It was replaced by Magdusa Ka in its timeslot.

Cast and characters

Lead cast
 Nadine Samonte as Elsa Paruel-Abrigo
 Polo Ravales as Andy Abrigo

Supporting cast
 Isabel Oli as Rosita Monteverde
 Carlo Aquino as Ernie Balboa
 Mike Tan as Rick Rivera
 Jacob Rica as Adrian Monteverde
 Alicia Alonzo as Leticia Paruel
 Pinky Amador as Carmen Paruel
 Dexter Doria as Aida Abrigo
 Arci Muñoz as Olivia "Olive" Paruel
 Juan Rodrigo as Augusto Monteverde

Ratings
According to AGB Nielsen Philippines' Mega Manila household television ratings, the pilot episode of Maging Akin Ka Lamang earned a 21.5% rating. While the final episode scored a 23.4% rating.

Accolades

References

External links
 

2008 Philippine television series debuts
2008 Philippine television series endings
Filipino-language television shows
GMA Network drama series
Live action television shows based on films
Philippine romance television series
Television shows set in the Philippines